The Cobequid Pass is the name given to a  tolled section of Nova Scotia Highway 104 (the Trans-Canada Highway) between Thomson Station, Cumberland County and Masstown, Colchester County in the Canadian province of Nova Scotia. The section is a public–private partnership; the highway is owned by the Highway 104 Western Alignment Corporation, a Crown corporation of the Government of Nova Scotia, with a toll plaza operated under contract by Atlantic Highway Management Corporation Limited, a subsidiary of Aecon Concessions. The toll plaza is located near the halfway point in Londonderry. It opened in 1997.

Tolls
On 16 December 2021 at 11 a.m., Cobequid Pass tolls were eliminated for passenger and commercial vehicles registered in Nova Scotia. As of 2022, Nova Scotia-registered vehicles have free passage through the Cobequid Pass, the toll is $4 for passenger vehicles registered outside of Nova Scotia and $3 per axle for out-of-province commercial vehicles.

From 2004 to 2021, the toll was $4 for all passenger vehicles. From 2005 to 2021, the toll was $3 per axle for large commercial trucks.

According to the Nova Scotia Department of Public Works, as of December 2021, about 50 per cent of passenger vehicles and about 70 per cent of commercial trucks using the Cobequid Pass were registered out-of-province.

There is both electronic toll collection as well as toll booth operators who only accept cash.  Toll collection operations are run by Atlantic Highway Management Corporation Limited (AHMCL), which is a subsidiary of the contractor, Atlantic Highways Corporation (AHC).  Both are now owned by Aecon.  AHC guaranteed the highway for three years, which was an unprecedented warranty period at that time, and all deficiencies were repaired at their expense.  Since the warranty expired in 2000 maintenance has been performed by the Department of Transportation & Infrastructure Renewal.

Name
The Cobequid Pass received its name from a combination of the Cobequid Mountains (which the highway crosses over) and the word "bypass". There is no geographic feature in Nova Scotia, such as an actual mountain pass in the Cobequid Mountains, having the name "Cobequid Pass".

History

This section of highway opened as a 4-lane divided freeway on 15 November 1997, with the prior alignment of Highway 104 between Thomson Station and Masstown being re-designated as part of Nova Scotia Trunk 4.

The Highway 104 Western Alignment Corporation was created by a provincial statute, the Highway 104 Western Alignment Act, whose sole purpose was to finance, design, construct, operate and maintain this new alignment of highway.  The Cobequid Pass Toll Highway was built with CAD $66 million in private financing (from CIT Financial) and CAD $27.5 million from the Government of Nova Scotia and CAD $27.5 million from the Government of Canada.  The private financing loan is being paid back through tolls collected at a toll booth located between KM 72 and 73 in Londonderry, Colchester County.

In 2019, an average of 7,600 cars and 2,100 trucks were passing through the Cobequid Pass every day.

1994-1995 funding controversy
This 2-lane uncontrolled access section included climbing Folly Mountain and was nicknamed "The Valley of Death" due to an increasing number of accidents with a high fatality rate that were occurring in the early to mid 1990s; it was political pressure resulting from these accidents that forced the cash-strapped provincial government to pursue toll financing for the realignment section now known as the Cobequid Pass Toll Highway.

Beginning in the fall of 1994 and continuing into 1995, national and local media began reporting on a controversy involving the $27.5 million funding for this project from the Government of Canada.  It was revealed that the federal Minister of Public Works, David Dingwall, had attempted to redirect approximately $26 million of highway funding designated for Nova Scotia from the proposed bypass of the Wentworth Valley toward upgrading sections of the Fleur-de-lis Trail, a scenic highway that ran through Mr. Dingwall's federal riding of Cape Breton—East Richmond, as well as that of provincial Minister of Transportation and Public Works, Richard Mann's riding of Richmond.  The controversy was capitalized by the Reform Party of Canada which erected a large sign beside the highway at Glenholme which read:

References

External links

Highway 104 Western Alignment Corporation official website

Nova Scotia provincial highways
Roads in Cumberland County, Nova Scotia
Roads in Colchester County
Toll roads in Canada
Public–private partnership projects in Canada
Electronic toll collection